Karen Anderson (born June Millichamp Kruse ; September 16, 1932 – March 17, 2018) was an American writer.  She published fiction and essays solo and in collaboration with her husband and others.

Biography
Anderson was born June Millichamp Kruse in Erlanger, Kentucky, a suburb of Cincinnati, Ohio.

In the 1980s she co-authored several books in collaboration with her husband, Poul Anderson.

She is noted as the first person to use the term filk music in print and she wrote the first published science fiction haiku (or scifaiku), "Six Haiku" (The Magazine of Fantasy and Science Fiction, July 1962). She also probably coined the term sophont to describe the general class of sapient beings.

In 1950 she, along with three friends, founded a Sherlock Holmes society, naming it the "Red Circle Society." She was, around this time, a friend of Hugh Everett III, of whose theories about parallel universes Poul Anderson later became an enthusiast.

Robert A. Heinlein dedicated his 1982 novel, Friday, in part to Anderson.

The writer Greg Bear was her son-in-law.

Bibliography

Novels

King of Ys
 Roma Mater (1986) with Poul Anderson
 Gallicenae (1987) with Poul Anderson
 Dahut (1987) with Poul Anderson
 The Dog and the Wolf (1988) with Poul Anderson

The Last Viking
 The Golden Horn (1980) with Poul Anderson
 The Road of the Sea Horse (1980) with Poul Anderson
 The Sign of the Raven (1980) with Poul Anderson

Collections
 The Unicorn Trade (1984) with Poul Anderson

References

External links
 Bibliography at SciFan
 
 

1932 births
2018 deaths
20th-century American novelists
American fantasy writers
American women novelists
Filkers
Writers from the San Francisco Bay Area
Women science fiction and fantasy writers
20th-century American women writers
Poul Anderson
People from Kenton County, Kentucky
English-language haiku poets